John Forté (born January 30, 1975) is an American recording artist and producer. He is primarily known for being a member of the musical duo Refugee Camp All-Stars, and his production work on the Fugees album The Score. He has released four albums. In 2000, Forté was arrested and charged with possession with intent to distribute cocaine and conspiracy to distribute; he was convicted and sentenced to the mandatory minimum 14 years after being found guilty. In 2008, Forté's prison sentence was commuted by President George W. Bush.

Career

Career beginnings and the Fugees

Forté studied classical violin; he especially enjoyed the work of Vivaldi. Eventually he matriculated to Phillips Exeter Academy in New Hampshire, where he graduated in 1993. After high school, Forté returned to New York City, enrolling in NYU as a music business major, where he roomed with rapper Talib Kweli, before dropping out to work as an artist & repertoire executive at Rawkus Records.

Forté began his professional music career when he was introduced to The Fugees by Lauryn Hill in the early 1990s. He co-wrote and produced several songs on their multi-platinum and Grammy-winning 1996 album, The Score. At 21 years of age, Forté was nominated for a Grammy for his work on the album. He went on to tour all over the world with The Fugees, and lent production and vocal performances to 1997's Wyclef Jean Presents the Carnival Featuring the Refugee All-Stars.

Forté partnered with former Fugee member, Pras, for the Top 40 hit single, "Avenues", from the Money Talks soundtrack.

Forté released his debut solo album, Poly Sci in 1998, which was produced by Wyclef Jean.  The album featured performances by Fat Joe, DMX, 20 Grand Pikasoe and Jeni Fujita, and exhibited the same intriguing mix of street and mainstream culture that helped The Fugees break new ground. It was met with critical acclaim but commercial disappointment, selling just under 100,000 copies, blamed in part on the fact that "the record's project manager quit Sony Music a week before the album was released, and Columbia Records put little cash behind its promotional tour." Spin called it "a crush between academia and street life that's utterly absorbing."

2000-2010
In 2000, Forté was arrested at Newark International Airport after accepting a briefcase containing $1.4 million worth of liquid cocaine; he was charged with possession with intent to distribute cocaine and conspiracy to distribute.  He was convicted and sentenced to the mandatory minimum 14 years after being found guilty, and incarcerated at FCI Loretto, a low-security federal prison in central Pennsylvania.

In 2001, Forté released the well-received I, John, which was recorded while awaiting trial for the drug offense.  Unlike his debut, this album takes a more serious approach to music-making. The second album featured guest appearances by Herbie Hancock, Esthero and Tricky, and included a duet with Carly Simon.

Simon and her son Ben Taylor were advocates on Forté's behalf, believing he did not receive a fair trial; they fought for an appeal of the mandatory minimum drug laws that remove a judge's discretion in a case. They met Forté through Taylor's cousin, who was a classmate of Forté's at Phillips Exeter.  "Carly is a mentor to me, a guide, absolutely my spiritual godmother," Forté has said.

With the help of Senator Orrin Hatch, Forté's prison sentence was commuted by President George W. Bush on November 24, 2008. He was released from prison four weeks later, on December 22, 2008.

Since leaving the Federal Correctional Institution, Fort Dix on December 22, 2008, Forté has recorded over 50 songs and played over 100 shows.

Soon after his release from prison, Forté recorded a cover of Kanye West's "Homecoming" with Talib Kweli. In the song, he discusses the issues surrounding his jail time. The music video was posted on Okayplayer.com on January 17, 2009. In 2009 he wrote various articles on TheDailyBeast.com, and Okayplayer.com interviewed him as he began his teaching job at the City College of New York in late March 2009.

In July 2009, Forté released StyleFree, the EP, a body of work that provided social commentary combined with hope and inspiration. It allowed his audience to bear witness to the remaking of a man. The single off the EP, "Play my Cards For Me," an audible reflection of his hip hop and R&B roots, was placed in the Queen Latifah/Common film Just Wright and the song "Nervous" was used in the film Stomp the Yard 2: Homecoming.

2010s: Later career

In January 2010, Forté's work was featured throughout the Sundance Film Festival, where, in addition to performing at the ASCAP Music Café, he scored all of the opening festival trailers, had the end credit song in the film Night Catches Us, and participated in a unique audio and visual collaborative effort with Joe Gordon-Levitt at hitrecord.org. In the spring of 2010, Forté and his band participated in a successful 15-city tour with K'Naan, Wale and Tabi Bonney. Forté founded a production company called Le Castle in 2011 to manage the various projects that he has undertaken in music, film and other fields.

In February 2011, Le Castle produced a 9-week tour through Russia.  Titled "From Brooklyn to Russia with Love!", the tour took Forté and his band – including bassist Brian Satz, percussionist Ryan Vaughn and keyboardist Patrick Firth – across Russia, from Moscow and St. Petersburg to Nizhny Novgorod, Kazan and Ekaterinburg, and other smaller locales along the Trans-Siberia Railway. Among the artists with whom Forté collaborated in Russia were Sunsay, Natasha Bedingfield, Evgeny Margulis, Alina Orlova, Billy's Band, Zero People, uma2rman, Emch Subatomic, Sergei Skrypka's State Symphony Cinema Orchestra, Romario, and more. All proceeds from the tour were donated to local orphanages and the international foundations Operation Smile and Petra Nemcova's Happy Hearts Fund. In September, Forté's begin releasing his first full-length album in 10 years, Water Light Sound.  The album features collaborations with international stars John Legend, Natasha Bedingfield, Talib Kweli, HD Fre, AZ, Colin Munroe, and Valerie June.  One of the tracks called "Your Side" (produced by Dallas Austin) was placed in EA FIFA World Cup 2010.

Water Light Sound will be launched in three vignettes. The first vignette "The Water Suite" will be made available to the public after an exclusive performance in Moscow on 27 September 2011, with Sunsay, an acclaimed artist from Ukraine with whom Forté  collaborated on the hit single "Windsong."  From Moscow, Forté will continue his promotional tour to such cities as Stockholm, London, Paris, and Casablanca.  The two remaining vignettes will be launched over the following months.

Forté also appeared on an episode of "NY Ink" January 2012.

Forté composed the theme song for the CBS News television documentary series Brooklyn DA.

Upcoming projects

Le Castle is currently finalizing a full-length documentary film about the "From Brooklyn to Russia with Love!" tour, and an album of his collaborations with Russian artists.  The film and album are scheduled for release in early 2012. Le Castle is also producing a number of collaborations for Forté with international artists. These projects will be released in the coming months.

Forté is also writing his memoir with Simon & Schuster.  The book will be published along with a body of original music.
 
A documentary is currently in production that chronicles the uncanny and unique life of Forté from his urban plight out of one of New York's most impoverished ghettos, to the alabaster halls of New England Prep School Phillips Exeter Academy. From worldwide stardom with multi-platinum hip-hop group The Fugees, to an unlikely seven-year incarceration for a drug offense and later to a miraculous commutation by former President George Bush, the documentary specifically explores Forté's return to society as a honed instrument for teaching and song and the acclimation process.  The film is being directed by Darryl Phillips and produced by Aarti Tandon and Darryl Phillips.

Charitable work

Forté frequently seeks to team up with charitable causes when performing on tour.  In the spring of 2011, Forté undertook a 9-week performance tour through Russia.  All proceeds from the tour were donated to local orphanages and the international foundations Operation Smile and Petra Nemcova's Happy Hearts Fund.

Forté has been working with at-risk youth to deter them from drugs and crime. He has taught a music course to 12- to 15-year-old students with In Arms Reach, a Harlem-based initiative for children of incarcerated parents.

In addition to using his musical abilities to help spread a positive message to children, he has been working with a New York-based charity called Music Unites to promote the arts in under served communities, where he educates students on his version of life, lessons learned, and the pursuit of happiness through music.

Forté has also been involved with various organizations dedicated to prison reform, mitigating prisoner recidivism, and reforming federal and state drug laws. He currently serves on the Board of Directors of The Fortune Society - a New York City-based non-profit which services formerly-incarcerated individuals reentering society.

Discography
 Poly Sci (1998)
 I, John (2002)
 Stylefree the EP (2009)
 Water Light Sound (2011)
 Riddem Drive (2020)
 Vessels, Angels & Ancestors (2021)

See also

 List of people pardoned or granted clemency by the president of the United States

References

External links

Public Radio Show State of the Re:Union Speaks with John Forté
John Forté Interviewed by Music Blog Synconation

1975 births
Living people
Phillips Exeter Academy alumni
African-American male rappers
People from North Brunswick, New Jersey
Recipients of American presidential pardons
American drug traffickers
Rappers from New Jersey
Rappers from Brooklyn
21st-century American rappers
21st-century American male musicians
21st-century African-American musicians
20th-century African-American people